Triplet-triplet annihilation (TTA) is an energy transfer mechanism between two molecules in their triplet state, and is related to the Dexter energy transfer mechanism. If triplet-triplet annihilation occurs between two molecules in their excited states one molecule transfers its excited state energy to the second molecule, resulting in one molecule returning to its ground state and the second molecule being promoted to a higher excited singlet, triplet or quintet state. 
Triplet-triplet annihilation was first discovered in the 1960s to explain the observation of delayed fluorescence in anthracene derivatives.

Photon upconversion
As triplet-triplet annihilation combines the energy of two triplet excited molecules onto one molecule to produce a higher excited state it has been used to convert the energy of two photons into one photon of higher energy, a process known as photon upconversion.
To achieve photon upconversion through triplet-triplet annihilation two types of molecules are often combined: a sensitizer and an emitter (annihilator). The sensitizer absorbs the low energy photon and populates its first excited triplet state (T1) through intersystem crossing. The sensitizer then transfers the excitation energy to the emitter, resulting in a triplet excited emitter and a ground state sensitizer. Two triplet excited emitters then can undergo triplet-triplet annihilation, and if a singlet excited state (S1) of the emitter is populated fluorescence results in an upconverted photon.

References 

Spectroscopy
Atomic physics